The state anthem of the Republic of Tatarstan was composed by Tatar musician Röstäm Yaxin and was first adopted in 1993 without lyrics. Twenty years later, lyrics written by Ramazan Baytimerov were made official.

Lyrics

Current lyrics
On 21 February 2013, the Parliament of Tatarstan unanimously approved lyrics written by Baytimerov. The lyrics were translated into Russian by Assyrian-Russian poet Filipp Pirayev.

The first two verses are sung in Tatar, followed by two verses sung in Russian.

Original lyrics 
The original proposed lyrics of the anthem titled "" ("My native country") was written by Ramazan Baytimerov in the 1970s, which was subsequently translated into Russian by Marsel Sabirov. During that time, Röstäm Yaxin was inspired to composed music that eventually became the national anthem. The Russian, however, was not adopted.

Notes

References

External links
Instrumental version

Tatarstan
Regional songs
Tatarstan
National anthem compositions in D-flat major